The 2010–11 season was Tottenham Hotspur Football Club's 19th season in the Premier League. It was their 33rd successive season in the top division of the English football league system.

The campaign featured Tottenham's first ever involvement in the UEFA Champions League, with the club entering via the play-off round after finishing fourth in the 2009–10 season. The club reached the quarter-finals of the competition where they were defeated by Real Madrid.

Season 2010–11

Transfers
Tottenham began their transfer movement for the 2010–11 season in mid-March, when Spurs completed the deal for young Brazilian midfielder Sandro, joining the club from Internacional, a club whom Tottenham have a key affiliation, with Sandro linking up with squad following the 2010 Copa Libertadores. Early in the transfer window, Tottenham retained the services of a number of key players, with club captain Ledley King signing a new two-year contract extension with the club, closely followed by former Chelsea goalkeeper Carlo Cudicini, who signed a new one-year contract following his recovery from a serious road accident sustained in November 2009.

Luka Modrić was the next player to commit his future with the club, signing an extended six-year deal to ensure his services until 2016. After two months of little transfer activity, Tottenham secured the controversial signing of William Gallas on a free transfer following his release from rivals Arsenal. As a result of the move, Gallas became the first Premier League player to play for Chelsea, Arsenal and Tottenham Hotspur, all London clubs and fierce rivals. On transfer deadline day, early in the day, Spurs confirmed the loan signing of Croatian international goalkeeper Stipe Pletikosa from Spartak Moscow. This looked to be Spurs' only move of the day, but in the final few moments before the deadline, news broke that Tottenham were in negotiations with Real Madrid midfielder Rafael van der Vaart. Following the closure of the transfer window, the club had to wait for the deal to be ratified by the Premier League, due to complications on Spurs' computer. The transfer was completed the next day, with fee believed to be around £8 million.

During the transfer window, a number of players left Spurs, beginning with young goalkeeper Lee Butcher, leaving to join Leyton Orient on a free transfer after his contract expired at Tottenham, followed a month later by defender Sam Cox signing a contract with Barnet, again, following the expiration of his Spurs contract. Soon after, a number of fringe and academy players, including veteran goalkeeper Jimmy Walker, left the club on free transfers. In early August, Queens Park Rangers completed the permanent signing of Adel Taarabt for a fee believed to be around £1 million; Taarabt had spent to 2009–10 season on loan at QPR before sealing a permanent deal. Tottenham's final permanent outgoing transfer of the summer transfer window saw French defender Dorian Dervite move to Spanish club Villarreal for an undisclosed fee.

The transfer window also saw younger player acquires loan move to gain regular football. The first loan move saw young goalkeeper David Button, fresh off of signing a new three-year contract, join Plymouth Argyle on a season-long loan, followed by another young goalkeeper, Oscar Jansson, joining Northampton Town until September 2010, and completing three loan moves in a week, England under-19 international John Bostock left to join Hull City for the duration of the 2010–11 season. Six days later, winger Andros Townsend signed a season-long loan for Ipswich Town after featuring for Tottenham in their pre-season tour of the United States. On the same day, Dean Parrett joined David Button at Plymouth on a one-month deal. The following day, Ryan Mason, who also featured in Spurs' pre-season, joined Doncaster Rovers on a one-month deal, trailed a week later with young striker Jon Obika clinching a move to Crystal Palace for the season.

Spurs then signed young South African defender Bongani Khumalo for £1.5 million from South Africa's reigning champions Supersport United as their first signing of the January window. Khumalo joined on a four-and-a-half-year deal. The first senior exit of the window was David Bentley, who moved out on loan to Birmingham City on 12 January; the loan expires at the end of the season. Spurs then captured another South African in Steven Pienaar from Everton, beating Chelsea to the midfielder's signature in a deal that cost Spurs £3 million. A fairly quiet window ended with senior players Robbie Keane, Giovani dos Santos and Jamie O'Hara joining West Ham United, Racing de Santander and Wolverhampton Wanderers on loan deals, respectively. All three players will return at the end of the season.

Pre-season friendlies
Tottenham began their pre-season by facing Harry Redknapp and Kevin Bond's former team, AFC Bournemouth, beginning the pre-season with a comfortable 4–0 win. A goal midway through the first half from Jon Obika established a Spurs lead, before a Roman Pavlyuchenko goal doubled the tally. Danny Rose made it three a minute later before another Pavlyuchenko goal wrapped up the game and the winning start.

Spurs then began a tour of the United States, beginning in San Jose, facing Major League Soccer (MLS) outfit San Jose Earthquakes, with the game ending 0–0. Tottenham made the trip to New York to compete in the New York Football Challenge, a tournament featuring Spurs, the New York Red Bulls, Sporting CP and Premier League rivals Manchester City. Spurs' first game saw them pitted against the home side Red Bulls with their new signing, Theirry Henry, making his debut. Henry opened the scoring against his old rivals, before goals from Robbie Keane and Gareth Bale in the second half gave Spurs the 2–1 win. In Tottenham's final game of the tournament, Spurs faced Portuguese side Sporting, resulting in a 2–2 draw, which resulted in Sporting lifting the trophy of the New York Challenge. Tottenham took an early lead through Robbie Keane, finishing a one-on-one with the 'keeper. Sporting hit back with goals from Chileans Matías Fernández and Jaime Valdés. Spurs equalised though, 20 minutes from time after Jon Obika ran on to a Keane through ball to earn the draw for Tottenham.

Spurs' first friendly at White Hart Lane in the pre-season saw them face Villarreal. Midway through the first half, Villarreal took the lead with former Manchester United striker Giuseppe Rossi finishing a Santi Cazorla through-ball. Villarreal doubled their lead ten minutes later with Rossi scoring his second with clinical finishing following a slip from Michael Dawson. Early in the second half, an early goal from Giovani dos Santos set up a possible comeback, but this was extinguished later in the second half, with Rossi securing his hat-trick with a heavily deflected effort on goal. Villarreal wrapped up the game late on with Marco Ruben scoring a tap-in to give the away team a 4–1 win. Tottenham then travelled to Lisbon to play Benfica in the Eusébio Cup. Spurs ended up lifting the trophy after securing a 1–0 win, with Gareth Bale scoring the only goal of the game early into the second half. Tottenham ended the pre-season with a home fixture against Italian side Fiorentina early August. In this game, a defensive error gifted Fiorentina the lead inside ten minutes through Alberto Gilardino. Ten minutes later, Spurs hit back though with an equalising goal from Roman Pavlyuchenko, scoring his fourth goal in pre-season. Fiorentina re-gained the lead though, with a shot from Adem Ljajić beating Heurelho Gomes. Spurs, however, equalised early in the second half with Robbie Keane goal before earning the 3–2 win with a last minute Keane goal to end the pre-season with four wins, two draws, and one loss.

August

Month summary

August league table

August game stats

September

Month summary

After the international break, Spurs went into September without the injured Jermain Defoe, who would later miss three months with an ankle injury sustained in international duty. September started with a visit to West Bromwich Albion, and in a game where both Rafael van der Vaart and William Gallas made their Spurs debut, the away side took the lead on 27 minutes through Luka Modrić, who would later have to come off injured. Spurs struggled without him and West Brom equalised with Chris Brunt's 50th career goal, a header in the 41st minute. Tottenham ended up taking the point though after goalkeeper Carlo Cudicini made a number of saves to deny West Brom a win as the game ended 1–1.

Spurs then kicked off their first match of the Champions League proper at Werder Bremen by going two goals to the good, first an own-goal by Bremen defender Petri Pasanen and then a trademark header by Peter Crouch from a Van der Vaart cross, only to be denied a famous victory with goals from Hugo Almeida and Marko Marin to earn Werder Bremen a point against a solid-looking Spurs side on the day.

Tottenham then returned to domestic duty with a home game against Wolverhampton Wanderers on 18 September. Wolves took the lead against what looked like a fatigued Spurs with Steven Fletcher beating Carlo Cudicini to make it 1–0 to Wolves. The introduction of fullback Alan Hutton for the injured Younès Kaboul just before half-time made Spurs look a changed side, and the substitute had a huge part in the equaliser after he was brought down in the penalty area to hand van der Vaart a chance to open his account from the spot – which he did, and Spurs went on to win the game 3–1 with goals from another substitute, Roman Pavlyuchenko, and Alan Hutton himself in the dying seconds to secure a Spurs victory.

The first North London derby of the season saw Spurs take on Arsenal at White Hart Lane in the League Cup third round. Goalkeeper Stipe Pletikosa, young defender Steven Caulker, and midfielder Sandro made their debuts in a cup tie in which Arsenal took the lead with youngster Henri Lansbury finishing off a crisp Arsenal passing move by sliding home a Jack Wilshere cross on 15 minutes. Spurs responded immediately though after half-time with substitute Robbie Keane scoring in the 49th minute after being released by Kyle Naughton. The game finished 1–1 in normal time and the final score was 1–4 to Arsenal, with two Samir Nasri penalty kicks and a straightforward Andrey Arshavin finish securing victory for the away side and guaranteed a fourth round place for Arsenal.

Spurs returned to Premier League action with another London derby defeat, this time to West Ham United at Upton Park. In an eventful match, this one was decided by a 29th minute Frédéric Piquionne header from a Mark Noble corner.

Spurs ended the month in action in the Champions League against Twente at White Hart Lane. In another impressive European game by Spurs' standards, Spurs missed a host of chances in the first half, including a Van der Vaart penalty, which was saved by the Twente goalkeeper Nikolay Mihaylov. Spurs though scored four in the second half, this time with van der Vaart opening the scoring from a Crouch knock-down two minutes after half-time and then proceeding to get sent off for a second yellow card. Pavlyuchenko made it two though from the spot in the 50th minute before Nacer Chadli poked home 6 minutes later for Twente, to pull it back to 2–1. Another Pavlyuchenko penalty and an individual effort from Gareth Bale made it 4–1 the final score and gave Spurs their first win in the Champions League proper.

Tottenham ended the month eighth in the Premiership and second in the Champions League Group A.

September league table

September game stats

October

Month summary

Spurs began the month of October in Premier League action, starting with a home game against Aston Villa. Spurs fell behind on 16 minutes, after Marc Albrighton slid home from close range to give the visitors the lead. Spurs fought back though, and eventually won the game through a brace from Rafael van der Vaart.

After a break of internationals, Spurs travelled to Craven Cottage for a London derby with Fulham. Spurs again fell behind after a simple Diomansy Kamara finish, but then replied straight from the kick-off, after Van der Vaart's chip rebounded off the top of the crossbar to Roman Pavlyuchenko, who couldn't really miss from almost a yard out. However, Spurs controversially won all three points after Tom Huddlestone hit a fierce long range shot into the bottom corner of the net, which the Fulham team thought had taken a nick off William Gallas, who was indeed standing in an offside position. The goal stood and it seemed it was the right decision, as the ball actually hit a Fulham defender on its way to goal rather than Gallas.

Tottenham were then facing the reigning European champions Internazionale on a night to remember for Spurs fans at the San Siro. Not even 2 minutes had gone when Spurs made the worst possible start after Javier Zanetti curled home past an onrushing Heurelho Gomes, who then conceded a penalty and was sent off after denying Jonathan Biabiany a goal scoring opportunity in the penalty area – Samuel Eto'o converted the penalty and scored another past Carlo Cudicini after Dejan Stanković had earlier given Inter a three-goal cushion, meaning that Spurs were 4–0 down in 14 minutes. The first half ended with the home side with four goals to the good, comfortably. Spurs, however, fought back in the second half, with a hat-trick from Gareth Bale, two of his goals coming in injury-time. Bale's hat-trick meant that the final score was 4–3 to Inter, but a remarkable comeback from Spurs to pull back three goals at the San Siro.

Spurs returned to Premiership action against Everton at White Hart Lane. In a fairly even match, Everton took the lead through a spectacular Leighton Baines free-kick in the 17th minute. Spurs however responded almost immediately with Rafael van der Vaart getting on the end of a Peter Crouch knock-down to equalise for Spurs three minutes after the opener. The game finished 1–1.

Tottenham ended the month with a controversial 2–0 defeat at Old Trafford to Manchester United. In an entertaining game, both sides hit the woodwork in the opening twenty minutes before Nemanja Vidić opened the scoring with a header. Then, five minutes from time, Nani scored the controversial second goal after Tottenham goalkeeper Gomes placed the ball down on the ground, thinking that a free-kick had been given in Tottenham's favour after Nani appeared to handle the ball. Nani's United teammates urged him to shoot, which he did, much to Gomes' and Tottenham's anger, but the goal somehow stood despite the linesman's flag going up for an unknown reason.

Spurs ended the month in fifth in the Premiership and second in their Champions League group.

October league table

October game stats

November

Month summary

November began with the visit of Internazionale to White Hart Lane in a Champions League tie. The reigning champions were without a couple of key players, most notably goalkeeper Júlio César. Tottenham were also missing first choice goalkeeper Heurelho Gomes through suspension; he was replaced by Italian Carlo Cudicini. Spurs made a flying start to the game, but it wasn't until twenty minutes when Rafael van der Vaart opened the scoring from close range. Spurs managed to hold on to the lead at half-time, when goalscorer van der Vaart then had to come off due to a recurrence of a hamstring injury – his replacement was Jermaine Jenas. Spurs continued to play as well as they did in the first half and doubled their lead deservedly on the hour, when Gareth Bale superbly ran past the right of Inter's defence and played in Peter Crouch, who made amends for an earlier miss by sliding home from six yards. Inter then pulled one back ten minutes from time through Samuel Eto'o, who scored a fine goal from an angle past Cudicini. As Inter pushed for an undeserved equaliser, Bale ran on to a through ball from Younès Kaboul, ran the Inter defence ragged and to cap off a man of the match performance, tapped the ball across goal for substitute Roman Pavlyuchenko to poke home to give Spurs a 3–1 win over the European champions.

Spurs returned to Premier League action away to Bolton Wanderers, without Aaron Lennon & Rafael van der Vaart through injury. Spurs started slowly, and fell behind after Kevin Davies lashed home the opener for Bolton. Spurs didn't improve in the second half, and were then 2–0 down after Grétar Steinsson screwed in an angled drive ten minutes after half-time. Spurs then failed to respond and conceded a penalty after Benoît Assou-Ekotto bundled over Lee Chung-yong in the box – Kevin Davies expertly dispatched the spot-kick from 12 yards for Bolton's third. However, Spurs fought back late on after a curler from Alan Hutton and a beautiful volley from Pavlyuchenko, but it wasn't enough as Bolton broke away and Martin Petrov, coming off the bench, slid home to make it 4–2 to Bolton.

Spurs then faced Sunderland in a midweek fixture at White Hart Lane. Spurs were held at 0–0 for more than hour, but took the lead on 64 minutes through Rafael van der Vaart, returning from injury. However, the match was to end as a 1–1 draw after Sunderland equalised through Asamoah Gyan to win a point for the visitors.

Spurs continued the month with another home game, this time against Blackburn Rovers. Spurs took the lead on 16 minutes with a Gareth Bale header from a van der Vaart corner. Spurs then pushed for a second, finally getting it at 42 minutes through Roman Pavlyuchenko, making amends for an earlier miss from the penalty spot. Spurs scored two second-half goals, with Peter Crouch scoring his first league goal of the season and Bale scoring his second of the game for 4–0. Blackburn fought back though and earned two late goals, first coming from Ryan Nelsen after David Dunn's long range shot deflected on to Nelsen's heel and into the back of the net and the second came from a Gaël Givet volley from close range, but it wasn't enough and Spurs held on for the three points.

The first league North London derby of the season saw Arsenal take on Spurs at the Emirates Stadium on 20 November. Arsenal took advantage of an error from Spurs goalkeeper Gomes, who failed to come out and claim the ball after a heavy touch from Samir Nasri – Gomes came out eventually and made an attempt to catch the ball, but it rebounded off Nasri's shin and Nasri ran on to the ball to slot home from the tightest of all angles on nine minutes. Arsenal doubled their lead on 27 minutes, after Andrey Arshavin crossed for Marouane Chamakh to slide home to give Arsenal a 2–0 advantage at half-time. Spurs then staged a comeback though, after Assou-Ekotto's long ball was flicked on by Jermain Defoe, returning from injury, into the path of van der Vaart who controlled well and released Bale, who only had Łukasz Fabiański to beat and did so well, with a good left foot finish five minutes after half-time. Luka Modrić went close with 25-yard drive that went narrowly over and then was brought down for a free-kick, which Arsenal captain Cesc Fàbregas deliberately handled to give Spurs a penalty. Van der Vaart made no mistake from the spot, sending Fabiański in the Arsenal goal to level for Spurs, and was then booked for his celebration. Spurs then went on to win the game after Gareth Bale was hauled down by Laurent Koscielny, resulting in a free-kick which was swung in by Van der Vaart for Younès Kaboul to head home with four minutes remaining, giving Spurs their first win away at Arsenal for 17 years and their first away win at a "Top Four" club in almost 70 games.

Spurs then had the chance to qualify to the knockout round of the Champions League, knowing that a win for them and Internazionale would secure qualification from Group A; to do so, Spurs had to beat Werder Bremen at White Hart Lane and Inter had to beat Twente. Spurs were on their way after another goal from Younès Kaboul on six minutes, from an Aaron Lennon cross. Bremen, ravaged by injuries and a suspension to captain Torsten Frings, then found themselves two goals down on the stroke of half-time after Luka Modrić got on the end of a Peter Crouch knock-down, turned and volleyed past Tim Wiese in the Bremen goal. Spurs secured the points and the qualification, as Inter had beaten Twente 1–0, with Peter Crouch scoring the third from close range late in the game.

Tottenham ended the month in Premiership action with a home game against Liverpool, 4 days after the match against Werder Bremen. Spurs once again fell behind on 42 minutes, with Martin Škrtel poking home after a goal-mouth scramble in the Tottenham box. Spurs pushed for the equaliser, and had a big chance to level after they were awarded a penalty when David N'Gog handled Gareth Bale's free-kick, but Defoe smashed the kick wide of the post. Spurs eventually equalised on 65 minutes, with Škrtel, having opened the scoring, diverted Modrić's low cross, which was on its way to Peter Crouch, into his own net to gift Spurs the equaliser. Spurs eventually won the game through Aaron Lennon, who beat Liverpool's Paul Konchesky to Peter Crouch's knock-down to fire past Pepe Reina to give Spurs a 2–1 victory.

Spurs finished November in fifth place and top of the Champions League Group A, securing qualification to the knockout round in the Champions League.

November league table

November game stats

December

Month summary
Spurs kicked off December with a 1–1 draw away to Birmingham City, having taken the lead through Sébastien Bassong on 20 minutes, only to concede a late equaliser from a Craig Gardner header.

Spurs then travelled to Holand to take on Dutch champions Twente, knowing that they could finish top of Group A if they could at least match Inter Milan's result at Werder Bremen. Spurs were gifted a bizarre lead after Twente goalkeeper Sander Boschker missed his kick from a Peter Wisgerhof back pass, causing the ball to end up in the corner of the goal. Twente were level after a re-taken Denny Landzaat penalty, after Roberto Rosales had a strike from 20 yards which appeared to hit the arm of Benoît Assou-Ekotto. Two minutes after half-time, Spurs took the lead again after a close range finish from Jermain Defoe, but Twente levelled a couple of minutes later from a Rosales header. Defoe then rebounded a Wilson Palacios shot, which was initially saved by Boschker, into the bottom corner of the net. Twente rescued a point though from Nacer Chadli's free-kick. Spurs finished top of Group A and were later drawn to Milan.

Spurs returned to Premier League action with a home game against Chelsea. Spurs took the lead on 15 minutes through a stunning strike from Roman Pavlyuchenko, set up by Jermain Defoe, who looked as if he was in an offside position before he passed the ball to Pavlyuchenko – nevertheless, the goal stood. More controversy was to follow, when Didier Drogba appeared to handle the ball before firing a shot on goal, which Tottenham goalkeeper Heurelho Gomes spilt into his own net. Chelsea were then awarded a penalty deep into injury time, after Gomes bundled over Chelsea midfielder Ramires in the area, only to then save Drogba's kick to ensure that the game finished 1–1.

The week after the Chelsea match, it was confirmed that Tottenham's match away to Blackpool had been postponed due to the bad weather conditions outside Bloomfield Road. The match was later rescheduled for 22 February.

Spurs kicked off the festive period with a trip to Aston Villa. Spurs took the lead through Rafael van der Vaart, returning from injury, before Jermain Defoe saw a controversial red for elbowing James Collins. Spurs held on to the lead for the first half and doubled in the second, thanks to Van der Vaart again. Villa pulled one back through Marc Albrighton, but it was not to be as Spurs held on for a crucial victory.

Ten-man Spurs then beat a resilient Newcastle United at White Hart Lane, thanks to second half goals from Aaron Lennon and Gareth Bale – the latter's goal coming after Younès Kaboul was sent off.

Spurs finished the month in 5th place.

December league table

December game stats

January

Month summary
Spurs got the year 2011 off to a good start by beating London rivals Fulham 1–0 in a tight match, with Gareth Bale heading in the only goal from Van der Vaart's free-kick.

A 2–1 loss at Everton meant that Tottenham's 11-match unbeaten run had ended, also concluding Tottenham's fine form in the festive period – an early goal from Louis Saha was cancelled out by a van der Vaart header but it wasn't to be as Séamus Coleman headed in Everton's winner late on in the game to give Everton the points.

Spurs then beat Charlton Athletic 3–0 in a third round FA Cup tie, with goals from youngster Andros Townsend and a quick-fire double from Jermain Defoe ensuring Spurs' safe passage into the fourth round of the competition.

Tottenham then returned to domestic action with a 0–0 draw with eventual champions Manchester United in a game in which they dominated but never really looked like winning.

Spurs again had to come back from behind at Newcastle after Fabricio Coloccini volleyed home the opener for Newcastle, but Aaron Lennon rescued a point late on with his second goal against Newcastle this season.

Tottenham concluded January with an FA Cup exit at Fulham, with 2 Danny Murphy penalties in fifteen minutes sandwiched by Michael Dawson's sending off meant that Fulham were truly on their way. Brede Hangeland and Mousa Dembélé piled on the misery for Spurs. Spurs failed to respond to conceding 4 goals in the first half and despite an improvement in the second, their elimination was confirmed.

Spurs finished the month fifth in the Premier League.

January league table

January game stats

League table

Transfers

In

Out

Loaned in

Completed loans

Squad list

Premier League

2010–11 season long-term injuries

Competitions

Pre-season and friendlies

Premier League

Matches

Results by matchday

Champions League

Play-off round

Tottenham Hotspur win 6–3 on aggregate.

Group stage

Knockout Phase

Round of 16

Tottenham Hotspur win 1–0 on aggregate.

Quarter-final

Real Madrid win 5–0 on aggregate

FA Cup

League Cup

Statistics

Appearances

Goal scorers 

The list is sorted by shirt number when total goals are equal.

Clean sheets

The list is sorted by shirt number when total clean sheets are equal.

Notes

References

Further reading

External links
Official Club site
BBC – Tottenham club news
Football 365 Spurs Homepage

2010–11 Premier League by team
2010-11
Tottenham Hotspur Fc Season, 2010-11
Tottenham Hotspur Fc Season, 2010-11
2010–11 UEFA Champions League participants seasons